The Taizé Community is an ecumenical Christian monastic fraternity in Taizé, Saône-et-Loire, Burgundy, France. It is composed of more than one hundred brothers, from Catholic and Protestant traditions, who originate from about thirty countries around the world. It was founded in 1940 by Brother Roger Schütz, a Reformed Protestant. Guidelines for the community’s life are contained in The Rule of Taizé written by Brother Roger and first published in French in 1954.

Taizé has become one of the world's most important sites of Christian pilgrimage, with a focus on youth. Over 100,000 young people from around the world make pilgrimages to Taizé each year for prayer, Bible study, sharing, and communal work. Through the community's ecumenical outlook, they are encouraged to live in the spirit of kindness, simplicity and reconciliation. The community's church, the Church of Reconciliation, was inaugurated on 6 August 1962. It was designed by a Taizé member and architect, Brother Denis. Young Germans from Action Reconciliation Service for Peace, created for reconciliation after World War II, assumed the work of building it. Owing to the founder's commitment, since its inception the community has evolved into an important site for Catholic–Lutheran ecumenism. A Catholic, Brother Alois, succeeded as prior after his predecessor's death in 2005.

History

Early years

The Taizé Community was founded by Brother Roger (Roger Schütz) in 1940. He pondered what it really meant to live a life according to the Scriptures and began a quest for a different expression of the Christian life. A year after this decision, Schütz reflected:

Because his native Switzerland was neutral and thus less affected by the war, Schütz felt as if France would be ideal for his vision, seeing it as a "land of poverty, a land of wartime suffering, but a land of inner freedom." He eventually settled in Taizé, which was a small, isolated village just north of Cluny, the site of a historically influential Christian monastic foundation.

In September 1940, Schütz purchased a small house that would eventually become the home of the Taizé Community. Only miles south of the demarcation line that separated Vichy France and the Zone occupée, Brother Roger’s home became a sanctuary to countless war refugees seeking shelter. On November 11, 1942, the Gestapo occupied Roger’s house while he was in Switzerland collecting funds to aid in his refuge ministry. Roger was not able to return to his home in Taizé until the autumn of 1944, when France was liberated.

In 1941, Brother Roger had published a few small brochures outlining several facets of a Christ-centred communal life together. These brochures prompted two young men to apply, soon followed by a third. They all lived in Switzerland in a flat owned by Roger’s family until after the war when they began a new life together in the French countryside. Over the next few years several other men would join the community. On Easter Sunday 1949, seven brothers committed themselves to a life following Christ in simplicity, celibacy and community.

Growth and current situation
In the years that followed, others joined. In 1969, a young Belgian doctor became the first Catholic to pledge his life to the Taizé Community. More brothers from Reformed, Anglican and Catholic backgrounds joined the community. Soon the Brothers of Taizé were making trips to take aid to people in both rural and urban areas. They began forming “fraternities” of brothers in other cities that sought to be “signs of the presence of Christ among men, and bearers of joy”. Since 1951, the brothers have lived, for longer or shorter periods, in small fraternities among the poor in India (chiefly in Calcutta), Bangladesh, the Philippines, Algeria, Brazil, Kenya, Senegal, and the United States (chiefly in the Hell’s Kitchen section of Manhattan, New York City).

In August 2005 Brother Roger, aged 90, was killed in a knife attack by a mentally-ill woman.  At his funeral, Brother Roger had an ecumenical dream fulfilled. The presider at his funeral was the president of the Vatican's council for the unity of Christians, Cardinal Walter Kasper. Anglican bishop Nigel McCulloch of Manchester, England, who represented Rowan Williams, the Archbishop of Canterbury, read the first reading in English. The second reading was read in French by the Rev. Jean-Arnold de Clermont, president of the Conference of European Churches, and in German by Bishop Wolfgang Huber, head of the Evangelical Church in Germany. Cardinals and archbishops, Orthodox, Anglican and other religious leaders and international politicians joined ordinary Christians in prayer during the funeral, including the President of Germany, Horst Köhler, and the retired Archbishop of Paris, Jean-Marie Lustiger. His funeral was attended by approximately 10,000 people.

In 2010, for the celebration of the 70th anniversary of Taizé, five years after Brother Roger's death, ecumenical messages of love and benediction were received from church leaders as varied as: 
 Pope Benedict XVI 
 Patriarch Bartholomew of Constantinople 
 Patriarch Kirill of Moscow 
 The Archbishop of Canterbury, Rowan Williams 
 The General Secretary of the Lutheran World Federation, Ishmael Noko
 The General Secretary of the World Communion of Reformed Churches, Setri Nyomi
 The General Secretary of the World Council of Churches, Olav Fykse Tveit
 The Archbishop of York, John Sentamu
 The Anglican Archbishop of the Cape, Thabo Cecil Makgoba
 The President of the German Bishops' Conference, Archbishop Robert Zollitsch
 The President of the Netherlands Episcopal Conference, Ad van Luyn
 The President of the Community of Christian Churches in the Canton of Vaud, Pastor Martin Hoegger.

At the end of 2010, the community was composed of about one hundred brothers, from Protestant and Catholic traditions, who originate from about thirty countries around the world. The community is currently led by Brother Alois, a German-born Catholic, who had been appointed by Brother Roger before his death.

Components

Music and worship

The community, though Western European in origin, has sought to include people and traditions worldwide. They have sought to demonstrate this in the music and prayers where songs are sung in many languages, and have included chants and icons from the Eastern Orthodox tradition. The music emphasizes simple phrases, usually lines from Psalms or other pieces of Scripture, repeated and sometimes also sung in canon.
Earlier Taizé community music was conceived and composed by Jacques Berthier. Later Joseph Gelineau became a major contributor to the music.

Ecumenical services based on this model and music are held in many churches throughout the world.

Young adult meetings

In Taizé

Throughout the year, meetings for young adults between 17 and 35  years old (and, within certain limits, for adults and families with children) take place in Taizé. The number of visitors reaches more than 5,000 during the summer and on Easter. Meetings usually last from Sunday to Sunday, though it is also possible to just come for a few days, or, for young volunteers, to stay for a longer time.

Several sisters also help with running the meetings. However, they are not "Taizé Sisters". These sisters come from various orders, most notably the Catholic order of St. Andrew from Belgium. The Sisters of St. Andrew live in the neighboring village Ameugny.

The schedule of a typical day in the youth meetings:
 Morning prayer
 Breakfast
 Introduction to the day with a brother of the community followed by quiet reflection or small group discussion
 Midday prayer
 Lunch
 Song practice (optional)
 Meetings
 Tea time
 Workshops (optional)
 Supper
 Evening prayer
 Informal gathering at Oyak, a common area at Taizé

The evening prayer is broadcast every Saturday at 22:00 Central European Time by the German radio station Domradio and provided online as a podcast.

Worldwide

The Taizé Community attempts to send pilgrims back from youth meetings to their local churches, to their parishes, groups or communities, to undertake, with many others, a “Pilgrimage of Trust on Earth.” Every year around New Year (usually from 28 December to 1 January), a meeting in a large European city attracts several tens of thousands of young adults. It is organized by brothers of the Taizé Community, sisters of St. Andrew, and young volunteers from all over Europe, and from the host city. The participants stay with local families or in very simple group accommodations. In the morning, they take part in a program organized by the parish closest to their accommodation. For their midday meal, all participants travel to a central location, usually the local exhibition halls. The meal is followed by a common prayer, and the afternoon is spent in workshops covering faith, art, politics and social topics. In the evening, everyone meets again for the evening meal and an evening prayer.

In his "Unfinished Letter", published after his death, Brother Roger is quoted to have proposed to "widen" the "Pilgrimage of Trust" originating from the Taizé community. As a result, international meetings for young adults have begun to take place, beginning with Kolkata in India in 2006. The program closely resembles the European meetings, though some aspects, such as the songs, are often adapted to the local culture.

See also
 Cenobitic monasticism
 Taizé - Music of Unity and Peace

Citations

References

External links

 
 Photo exhibition on Flickr
 Photo gallery of the youth meetings
 Life at Taizé—15 minute film
 Archbishop of Canterbury's message to young people preparing to visit the Taizé Community
 Example of Taizé songs on YouTube
 Sheet music of Taizé chants
 Article in The Tablet, 2012
 Article in The Independent, 2011
 Photo essay on the Taizé Community
 Priory Church of Reconciliation, Taizé: Mystery worshipper report, Ship of Fools

Christian organizations established in 1940